The Middlebury-Monterey Language Academy (MMLA) is a summer language immersion program for pre-college students in 8th–12th grades.  Founded in 2008 by Middlebury College and its graduate school, the Monterey Institute of International Studies,  the Language Academy convenes on two college campuses in the United States and at three abroad locations.  Languages taught at MMLA include Arabic, French, German, Chinese and Spanish.

Curriculum 
MMLA requires students to take a Standards Based Assessment of Proficiency (STAMP) test and an ACTFL test, administered at the beginning of the summer. MMLA faculty use this test to place students into proficiency levels. There are five proficiency levels in Chinese, German, French, and Spanish academies, and three proficiency levels in the Arabic academy. The STAMP test is also administered at the conclusion of MMLA’s summer program. MMLA uses these two STAMP tests to measure student progress and submit a metric to the regular school-year teachers of MMLA students.   

The Academy organizes its curricular calendar into four weeks, each assigned a theme by MMLA faculty. Following these themes, faculty cover one lesson unit each regular day.  There are nineteen total lesson units in a summer at each Language Academy. Lessons change week-by-week according to the students' experience in an immersion language program. For example, during the initial week, the curriculum makes efforts to include vocabulary that will help students begin living on a college campus. The curriculum that faculty use is a program designed by MMLA in 2010.  MMLA asserts that this program is based around the student workbook, designed, edited, and translated by MMLA staff in 2011.

Language Pledge
Middlebury-Monterey Language Academy requires students, faculty and staff participate in a "Language Pledge." The Language Pledge is a formal agreement meant to encourage members of the program to communicate in a foreign language. The Language Pledge originated with Middlebury College's Language Schools and is included in the Middlebury College curriculum at its schools abroad and graduate program.  

MMLA asserts that the Language Pledge is a central concept in its pedagogy. Events throughout the four-week calendar of the program often focus on the Language Pledge. The concept has been adjusted from year to year in an effort to accommodate a student body that includes young, beginner students and older, advanced students.

History

Middlebury College Language Schools 

Founded in 1800 in Middlebury, Vermont, Middlebury College is most often recognized for an undergraduate liberal arts program on its Vermont campus. In 1915, the College established the first Language School, the School of German.  In an attempt to maintain an immersion environment, faculty at this summer program asked that students and colleagues commit to a "Language Pledge" to communicate exclusively in their target language.  The Schools offer instruction in Arabic, Chinese, French, German,  and Spanish.  Currently, Middlebury Monterey Language Academy run programs at Green Mountain College in Vermont and another college in Vermont.  For years they had programs at Green Mountain, Swarthmore, Pomona, and Oberlin Colleges.  In 2015 they will only be offering programs at the two campuses in Vermont.

Middlebury-Monterey Language Academy 
Middlebury College and its graduate school, the Monterey Institute of International Studies opened MMLA with the intent of hosting a Language Schools program for pre-college students.  The summer program has often highlighted its use of the Middlebury Language Pledge and maintains that the Pledge helps create an educational community and promotes a language immersion environment.  MMLA opened in 2008, and now hosts Academies on the U.S. campuses of Saint Michael's College, Colchester, Vermont and Green Mountain College, Poultney, Vermont. These locations teach Arabic, German, Chinese, French, and Spanish.

Current locations 

Green Mountain College, Poultney, Vermont

Languages: Arabic, German, Spanish

Saint Michael's College, Colchester, Vermont

Languages: French and Chinese

Study Chinese Abroad: Beijing, China

Languages: Chinese

Study Spanish Abroad: Granada, Spain

Languages: Spanish

Study French Abroad: Quebec City, Canada

Languages: French

Sources
Middlebury College Language Schools
Middlebury-Monterey Language Academy Curriculum
Middlebury-Monterey Language Academy Campuses

Middlebury College
Language schools in the United States
Educational institutions established in 2008
Language immersion
2008 establishments in the United States